Eridanosaurus is an extinct genus originally described as a crocodilian, but later shown to be a rhinoceros (specifically, based on a rhinoceros vertebra). It is known from Italy.

References

Prehistoric rhinoceroses
Prehistoric mammals of Europe